The black-clawed brush-furred rat (Lophuromys melanonyx) is a species of rodent in the family Muridae. It is found only in Ethiopia. Its natural habitat is subtropical or tropical high-altitude grassland. It is threatened by habitat loss.

References

Sources

Endemic fauna of Ethiopia
Lophuromys
Mammals of Ethiopia
Mammals described in 1972
Taxonomy articles created by Polbot
Ethiopian montane moorlands